Ovidiu Iuliu Moldovan (January 1, 1942 – March 12, 2008) was a Romanian actor known for his work in Romanian film and television roles. However, Moldovan focused almost exclusively on theater and stage roles during the later years of his career.

Moldovan was born on January 1, 1942, in Vișinelu, Mureș County. He was awarded the UNITER prize for his career achievements as a Romanian actor in 2004.

He died of cancer at the age of 66 at the University Hospital in Bucharest, Romania, on March 12, 2008, and was buried at Bellu Cemetery.

His last theater role was in the Romanian play, Celălalt Cioran, which means The Other Cioran. Moldovan's final play was named after Romanian philosopher, Emil Cioran.

Romanian President Traian Băsescu posthumously appointed Moldovan Knight of the Order of the Star of Romania on March 15, 2008.

Selected filmography
 1973 - Despre o anume fericire, directed by Mihai Constantinescu
 1975 - Actorul și sălbaticii
 1975 - Hyperion
 1975 - Cercul magic, regia David Reu
 1976 - Dincolo de pod
 1976 - Ultimele zile ale verii
 1976 - Misterul lui Herodot
 1976 - Bunicul și doi delincvenți minori
 1976 - Trei zile și trei nopți
 1977 - Tufă de Veneția
 1978 - Profetul, aurul și ardelenii
 1978 - Avaria - Hristu
 1978 - Buzduganul cu trei peceți
 1979 - Între oglinzi paralele
 1979 - Un om în loden
 1979 - Cumpăna
 1980 - Artista, dolarii și ardelenii
 1980 - Bietul Ioanide
 1981 - Pruncul, petrolul și ardelenii
 1981 - Castelul din Carpați
 1981 - Detașamentul „Concordia”
 1981 - Duelul
 1982 - Semnul șarpelui
 1982 - Întîlnirea
 1982 - Cucerirea Angliei
 1983 - Viraj periculos
 1983 - Misterele Bucureștilor
 1983 - Dreptate în lanțuri
 1983 - Acțiunea Zuzuc, directed by Gheorghe Naghi
 1984 - Sosesc păsările călătoare
 1984 - Vreau să știu de ce am aripi, directed by  Nicu Stan
 1984 - Horea
 1985 - Masca de argint
 1985 - Din prea multă dragoste
 1986 - Punct și de la capăt, directed by Alexa Visarion
 1986 - Cuibul de viespi, directed by Horea Popescu
 1987 - Egreta de fildeș
 1989 - Flori de gheață, directed by Anghel Mira
 1989 - Misiunea -  TV series, directed by Virgil Calotescu
 1992 - Krystallines nyhtes
 1994 - Somnul insulei
 1994 - Nopți de cristal, directed by Tonia Marketaki 
 1995 - Craii de Curtea-Veche, directed by Mircea Veroiu
 1996 - Crăciun însângerat, directed by Claudio Nasso  
 1999 - Anii tinereții noastre (1999) - as Narrator

References

External links 

1942 births
2008 deaths
20th-century Romanian male actors
Romanian male film actors
Romanian male stage actors
Burials at Bellu Cemetery
Romanian Greek-Catholics
The Transylvanians series
Knights of the Order of the Star of Romania
Deaths from cancer in Romania
People from Sărmașu